Steven Cohen (born 27 February 1986) is a French-Israeli professional association football player who is currently without a club.

Biography

Early life 
Cohen was born in Marseille to a French father with Israeli citizenship and Jewish mother.

From Montpellier to Ferrol 
Cohen was brought up through the youth ranks of French club Montpellier HSC. After being released by Montpellier, Cohen landed at Spanish club Racing Club de Ferrol. The second season for Cohen in Spain proved to be his breakout year and he was courted by Deportivo de La Coruña who agreed to terms with Cohen on a four-year contract. Due to budget issues at Deportivo, the deal was canceled and Cohen traveled to Israel to visit family and friends. During this visit, he went on a week-long trial at F.C. Ashdod. When push came to shove, no final offers had been made and Cohen returned to Spain to play for UD Salamanca.

Move to Israel 
In August 2009, Cohen spurned offers from clubs in Spain and Turkey and signed a two-year deal starting at €80K, with a one-year option, with Israeli club Hapoel Ra'anana. In doing so, Cohen advanced his dream of one day playing for the Israeli national team and became the most expensive signing ever for Hapoel Ra'anana.

Cohen's debut in Israel was on 12 September 2009 in a Premier League match between Hapoel Ra'anana and Maccabi Netanya.
In August 2010, Cohen signed for a 1-year contract at Beitar Jerusalem. After two seasons with Beitar, Cohen moved for Waasland-Beveren but after less than a month with the Belgian club he decided to get back to Israel and played another season with Beitar. In the 2013-14 he played for Hapoel Acre. After one season in Acre, Cohen signed a two-year contract with Hapoel Haifa.

Honours
Toto Cup:
Runner-up (1): 2009-10

Statistics

See also
List of select Jewish football (association; soccer) players

Footnotes

External links 
 

1986 births
Living people
French footballers
Jewish French sportspeople
Jewish Israeli sportspeople
Israeli footballers
Footballers from Marseille
Montpellier HSC players
Racing de Ferrol footballers
UD Salamanca players
S.K. Beveren players
French emigrants to Israel
Hapoel Ra'anana A.F.C. players
Beitar Jerusalem F.C. players
Hapoel Acre F.C. players
Hapoel Haifa F.C. players
Israeli Premier League players
Expatriate footballers in Belgium
Expatriate footballers in Spain
Israeli expatriate sportspeople in Belgium
French expatriate sportspeople in Belgium
Israeli expatriate sportspeople in Spain
French expatriate sportspeople in Spain
Association football midfielders